Faiyazul Azam (born 30 December 1936) is an Indian politician and former member of the Bihar Legislative Assembly representing Sikta for three terms as an Independent, Indian National Congress (O) candidate and Indian National Congress candidate. He was elected to the 10th Lok Sabha from Bettiah as a Janata Dal candidate.

References 

1936 births
Living people